Liu Hsien-tong (born 24 March 1952) is a Taiwanese politician who served in the Legislative Yuan from 1999 to 2002. He joined the Democratic Progressive Party shortly after stepping down from the legislature.

References

1952 births
Living people
Kaohsiung Members of the Legislative Yuan
Kuomintang Members of the Legislative Yuan in Taiwan
Democratic Progressive Party (Taiwan) politicians
Members of the 4th Legislative Yuan
Feng Chia University alumni